Dave Ruby is an American actor. He is best known for his role as Zeke in the film Dead Man on Campus as well co-starring role in the UPN sitcom Grown Ups and his recurring role as Dr. Lloyd on Judging Amy.

Career 
Ruby's other television credits include Saved by the Bell: The New Class, Married... with Children, Boston Common, Bone Chillers, Guys Like Us, The Division, The Amanda Show as well as a recurring role on the TNT series Bull.

Filmography

Film

Television

References

External links

20th-century American male actors
21st-century American male actors
American male film actors
American male television actors
Living people
Place of birth missing (living people)
Year of birth missing (living people)